The Chilean submarine Quidora was an H-class submarine of the Chilean Navy. The vessel was originally ordered by the United Kingdom's Royal Navy as HMS H19, but was handed over to Chile in 1917 as H5.

Description
Quidora was a single-hulled submarine, with a pressure hull divided into five watertight compartments. She displaced  on the surface and  submerged. The H-class submarines had a crew of 22 officers and enlisted men.

The submarine had two propellers, each of which was driven by a  diesel engine as well as a  electric motors. This arrangement gave Quidora a maximum speed of  while surfaced and  submerged. The H-class submarines were equipped with four  torpedo tubes in the bow and carried eight torpedoes.

Construction and service
H19 was a H-class submarine built by Fore River Yard of Quincy, Massachusetts. She was launched on 25 August 1915. As a result, H19 was never commissioned into the Royal Navy. Instead, she and H13, H16, H17, H18, and H20 were transferred to the Chilean Navy as partial recompensation for the appropriation of two 28,000-ton dreadnoughts ( and ). Originally named H5 when turned over to Chile in 1917, she was renamed Quidora in 1924. She served with the Chilean Navy until she was stricken in 1945.

Notes

References

 

British H-class submarines
Ships built in Quincy, Massachusetts
1915 ships
World War I submarines of the United Kingdom
British H-class submarines of the Chilean Navy
World War II submarines of Chile